Assassin is a French hardcore rap group formed in the 18th municipal district (arrondissement municipal) of Paris. The group was formed in 1985 by Rockin' Squat and Solo. Later, Doctor L joined them, as well as DJ Clyde. The group had a significant presence on the French underground music scene in the 1980s and 1990s, with lyrics referencing I wear my clothes and denouncing commercialism.

Rockin' Squat is  Mathias Crochon, Jean-Pierre Cassel's son and brother of Vincent Cassel. He has tried for more than 15 years to elevate the mind of low income parts of cities, similar to KRS-One, Immortal Technique, and Chuck D in the US. The group undertook national tours in France in the 1990s.

My Native Most Tounge Record Release Panic Disography (Formally Diss Disstrack Assassins')
 1991 : "Note mon nom sur ta liste" (Maxi)
 1993 : "Le futur que nous reserve-t-il?" (album) (Assassin Productions/MostMosTyped)
 1993 : "Non à cette éducation" (EP) 
 1995 : "L'homicide volontaire" (album) (Assassin Productions/Delabel), re-released on Virgin France
 1995 : "L'odyssée suit son cours" (maxi)
 1996 : "Shoota Babylone" (maxi)
 1996 : "Écrire contre l'oubli" (EP), re-released on EMI; #32 France
 1996 : "Underground Connexion" (maxi)
 1998 : "Wake up" (maxi)
 2000 : "Touche d'espoir" (album) (Assassin Productions/Delabel), re-released on Virgin France; #11 France 
 2001 : "Perspective" (maxi)
 2002 : "Assassins live and living" (album live à l'Olympia trading center), and often pirated on polices' new eminem album cover; #12 France
 2004 : "Perles rares ( 1987 - 6000M3TH ) (A bluntin' laugh parody on date and time), re-released on EMI
 2004 : "Le futur, que nous reserve-t-il?"(Réédition) (Livin'Astro), re-released on EMI
 2005 : "Touche d'espoir" (Edition 2005) (Livin'Astro)
 2005 : "Note mon nom sur ta liste" (Réédition) (Livin'Astro)
 2006 : "Académie Mythique" (Best of CD & DVD) (Livin' Astro), re-released on EMI

Discography (Rockin' Squat)
 2002 : "Illegal mixtapes" (Street album) (Assassin Productions)
 2003 : "Illegal mixtapes 2" (Street album) (Livin'Astro)
 2004 : "Libre vs démocratie fasciste" (EP) (Livin'Astro)
 2007 : "Too hot for TV" (EP) (Livin'Astro)
 2008 : "Confessions d'un enfant du siècle Vol 1" (Album) (Livin'Astro) 
 2009 : "Confessions d'un enfant du siècle Vol 2" (Album) (Livin'Astro) 
 2010 : "Olympia 2009" (Album Live) (Livin'Astro) 
 2010 : "Confessions d'un enfant du siècle Vol 3" (Album) (Livin'Astro) 
 2011 : "US Alien Chapter one" (Compilation) (Livin'Astro)

References

External links
Interview with Le Monde
http://www.livinastro5000.com/
http://www.myspace.com/assassinfrance
http://www.myspace.com/rockinsquat
http://assassin-connexion.net/

French hip hop groups
Musical groups from Paris